El Mercurio de Valparaíso is the oldest continuously circulating periodical, published under the same name, in the Spanish language. It was founded on September 12, 1827. It is based in Valparaíso, Chile.

See also
El Mercurio

External links

Publications established in 1827
Mass media in Valparaíso
Newspapers published in Chile
1827 establishments in Chile